Samuel Beatty may refer to:

 Samuel Beatty (general) (1820–1885), Union general of the American Civil War
 Samuel Beatty (mathematician) (1881–1970), Canadian academic, mathematician, and Chancellor
 Samuel A. Beatty (1923–2014), American jurist and educator
 Samuel Beatty Wilson, founder of Phi Gamma Delta fraternity